Alex Ribeiro (born 1989) is a Brazilian professional surfer who competes on the World Surfing League Men's World Tour since 2016. Ribeiro earned a spot on the 2016 World Championship Tour season by finishing in 7th place on the 2015 WSL World Qualifying Series season.

Career

Victories

WSL World Championship Tour

References

External links

Brazilian surfers
1989 births
Living people
Sportspeople from São Paulo
People from Praia Grande